Zarima River is a tributary of the Tekezé River.  The Wolkayite Irrigation Project is based on a tributary of the Zarima River known as the Dukoko River.

See also 
List of rivers of Ethiopia

References

Rivers of Ethiopia